Nilima may refer to:

Nilima Ibrahim, Bangladeshi educationist, littérateur and social worker.
Nilima Jogalekar, Indian Women Cricketer.
Nilima Sen, Rabindrasangeet singer.